The Alexander Theatre is a Finnish theatre in the city of Helsinki at Bulevardi 23–27, also known as Russian Theatre.

History
In the summer of 1875, then Governor-General of Russian Finland (1866-1881) Count Nikolay Adlerberg (of Swedish noble descent), a frequent theatregoer, received Alexander II of Russia's permission to build a Russian theatre for Russians living in Helsinki. The building was designed by the engineer Colonel Pjotr Petrovitš Benard, though probably on the basis of standardized drawings. The auditorium of the theatre was decorated by the Saint Petersburg architect Jeronim Osuhovsky, and the Finnish artist Severin Falkman decorated the ceiling paintings, which contain twelve cupids reminiscent of the Mariinsky Theatre in Saint Petersburg. The theatre's technology was designed by Iosif Vorontsov; the theatre itself was completed in October 1879, and in February 1880 it was named after Russian Tsar Alexander II.

The grand opening occurred on 30 March 1880 with Charles Gounod's Faust.

In 1918 the Finnish National Opera and Ballet moved to the Alexander Theatre, and remained in the premises until 1993. After the Finnish National Opera and Ballet moved to their newly built house, the Alexander Theatre  got back its historical name and once again became a theatre venue.

Since 1993, the theatre has been used for guest stage performances of various genres. The complex also houses different offices, rehearsal facilities, dance studios and different companies.

The Alexander Theatre is reportedly haunted by the ghost of a dead officer. It is assumed that he died during the Crimea War and moved to Helsinki, as the tiles of Alexander Theatre were moved there from Åland.

Notes

External links
  

Theatres in Helsinki
Opera houses in Finland
Cultural history of Finland
1879 establishments in Finland
Theatres completed in 1879
Kamppi